William Lee "Wild Bill" Everitt (December 13, 1868 – January 19, 1938) was an infielder in Major League Baseball from 1895 to 1901. Everitt played for the Chicago Colts/Orphans and the Washington Senators.

In 698 games over seven seasons, Everitt posted a .317 batting average (902-for-2,842) with 535 runs, 11 home runs, 341 RBIs, 186 stolen bases and 212 bases on balls. He finished his career with a .946 fielding percentage.

See also
 List of Major League Baseball career stolen bases leaders

References

External links
 Baseball Reference

1868 births
1938 deaths
Major League Baseball first basemen
Major League Baseball third basemen
Chicago Colts players
Chicago Orphans players
Washington Senators (1901–1960) players
19th-century baseball players
Baseball players from Fort Wayne, Indiana
Minor league baseball managers
San Francisco Haverlys players
Augusta Electricians players
Detroit Creams players
Denver Grizzlies (baseball) players
Colorado Springs Millionaires players
Sportspeople from Fort Wayne, Indiana
Baseball players from Chicago